Li Hongyang (born 1 April 1984, in Tianjin) is a Chinese footballer who currently plays for Tianjin Teda in the Chinese Super League.

Club career
Li started his professional career with Xiamen Lanshi in 2002. He transferred to Shenzhen Kingway in 2006. Li moved back to hometown club Tianjin Teda in February 2009. However, he failed to establish himself within the team and transferred to Chengdu Blades in July 2009. He returned to Tianjin Teda in January 2012. On 1 May 2012, he made his debut for Tianjin in the fifth round of 2012 AFC Champions League group stage which Tianjin Teda lost to Central Coast Mariners 5–1 at Central Coast Stadium.

Honours
Xiamen Lanshi
China League One: 2005
Chinese Jia-B League: 2002

References

1984 births
Living people
Chinese footballers
Footballers from Tianjin
Shenzhen F.C. players
Chengdu Tiancheng F.C. players
Tianjin Jinmen Tiger F.C. players
Association football defenders
Chinese Super League players
China League One players